Buras-Triumph is a former census-designated place in Plaquemines Parish, Louisiana, United States. The population was 3,358 at the 2000 census. For the 2010 census, Buras-Triumph was split into the CDPs of Buras and Triumph. On the peninsula, Buras has been located higher, with Triumph located southeast of Buras.

History

The town of Buras was established, informally, in the 1840s. Several small settlements on the West Bank of the Mississippi River north of Fort Jackson became known collectively as the Quartiers des Burats, the Burat Settlement, anchored on the property of Sebastian Burat, near where Cazezu Boulevard meets Parish Highway 11 today. Burat was later anglicized to Buras. In 1854, the Buras Post Office was established, along with a regular mail route by packet boat on the river. By 1864, a new church, Our Lady of Good Harbor, was established in Buras as the community grew.

Civil War 
In April 1862, during the American Civil War, the Battle of Forts Jackson and St. Philip took place near Buras. Union Flag Officer David Farragut led a fleet up the river to capture New Orleans and engaged the forts in the early morning hours of April 23. A single Union vessel, the USS Varuna, was sunk near Buras in an engagement with the Confederate steamer CSS Governor Moore and the CSS Stonewall Jackson. The heavily damaged Governor Moore also sank, not far from its Union opponent.

20th century 

In the first decades of the 20th century, Buras' primary industries were oyster fishing and citrus farming. In the 1930s, petroleum was discovered in the region, along with natural gas and sulfur. One of the first producing fields was established in Quarantine Bay, east of Buras, by the Gulf Oil Company. With the coming of the oil and gas industries, Buras began to slowly evolve from a farming and fishing village into a larger community.

Hurricanes 

Buras-Triumph and the surrounding communities have been subjected to many devastating hurricanes over the years, including the 1893 Cheniere Caminada hurricane, which destroyed the original church, the 1901 Louisiana hurricane, the 1915 New Orleans hurricane, Hurricane Betsy in 1965, and Hurricane Camille in 1969.

More recently, this area was the location where, on August 29, 2005, the eye of Hurricane Katrina first made landfall in Louisiana. Although Katrina was one of the costliest natural disasters to strike the U.S., according to the Hurricane Severity Index, at landfall both Betsy and Camille were higher-intensity hurricanes than Katrina. However, the loss of surrounding marsh lands to erosion and subsidence allowed the energy of Hurricane Katrina's storm surge to overtop the levee system and the area was devastated yet again.

Emblematic of the rebuilding and recovery is the new Buras water tower. The image of the previous tower, collapsed in the rubble, was an icon of the destruction Katrina brought. (See photos.)

Geography
Buras-Triumph is within the federal hurricane protection levee system. Approximately  of the area are drained by two stormwater pumping stations, one north of Buras and one in Triumph.

Demographics
As of the census of 2000, there were 3,358 people, 1,146 households, and 850 families residing in the CDP. The racial makeup of the CDP was 71.68% White, 10.90% African American, 1.67% Native American, 12.30% Asian, 1.28% from other races, and 2.17% from two or more races. Hispanic or Latino of any race were 1.10% of the population.

There were 1,146 households, out of which 40.4% had children under the age of 18 living with them, 53.6% were married couples living together, 12.7% had a female householder with no husband present, and 25.8% were non-families. 20.9% of all households were made up of individuals, and 8.1% had someone living alone who was 65 years of age or older. The average household size was 2.92 and the average family size was 3.40.

In the CDP, the population was spread out, with 30.3% under the age of 18, 10.0% from 18 to 24, 29.7% from 25 to 44, 22.1% from 45 to 64, and 7.9% who were 65 years of age or older. The median age was 32 years.  For every 100 females, there were 102.4 males. For every 100 females age 18 and over, there were 105.9 males.

The median income for a household in the CDP was $33,059, and the median income for a family was $41,216. Males had a median income of $35,980 versus $16,917 for females. The per capita income for the CDP was $13,426. About 18.1% of families and 20.7% of the population were below the poverty line, including 23.2% of those under age 18 and 15.2% of those age 65 or over.

Education
Plaquemines Parish School Board operates the public schools of the parish.

It is served by South Plaquemines High School in Buras. Prior to 2005 Buras Middle School and Buras High School served the community, but Hurricane Katrina damaged the buildings.

References

External links

Major roads.

Former census-designated places in Louisiana
Geography of Plaquemines Parish, Louisiana
Unincorporated communities in New Orleans metropolitan area
Louisiana populated places on the Mississippi River
Unincorporated communities in Louisiana